Art Mûr is a private contemporary art gallery in Montreal, Quebec, Canada.

History
Founded in 1996 by Rhéal Olivier Lanthier & François St-Jacques, Art Mur was originally located on Notre-Dame Street, in the Saint-Henri neighborhood of Montreal. Since 2002, the gallery has been situated at 5826 Saint Hubert Street in the borough of Rosemont–La Petite-Patrie. Art Mûr is a member of The Contemporary Art Galleries Association (AGAC) and Mr. Lanthier has been the president since March 2008.

Art Mûr Publications
 From Cooke-Sasseville to Today (2012)
 Nadia Myre: En[counter]s (2011)
 Cal Lane: Sweet Crude (2009)
 Jinny Yu (2008)
 Shayne Dark: Into the Blue (2008)

Other achievements and mentions
The 10th anniversary of Art Mûr was featured in the Winter 2006-07 edition of Vie des Arts (vol. 50, n°205)
In 2003, the gallery was named "Best New Space" by Isa Tousignant, the journalist for the Hour (Montreal), and François St-Jacques et Rhéal Olivier Lanthier were awarded "Best gallery directors" by Christine Redfern, the journalist for the Montreal Mirror.

References

External links
 Art Mûr website
 The Contemporary Art Galleries Association (AGAC) 

1996 establishments in Quebec
Art galleries established in 1996
Art in Montreal
Art museums and galleries in Quebec
Buildings and structures in Montreal
Event venues established in 1996
Rosemont–La Petite-Patrie